The 2015 Nongfu Spring World Cup was a professional non-ranking team snooker tournament that took place from 15 to 21 June 2015 at the Wuxi City Sports Park Stadium in Wuxi, China. It was the 14th edition of the event, and it was televised live by Eurosport.

Teams and players

Prize fund
Winner: $200,000
Runner-Up: $100,000
Semi-final: $60,000
Quarter-final: $40,000
Third in group: $22,500
Fourth in group: $15,000
Fifth in group: $10,000
Sixth in group: $7,500
Total: $800,000

Format

The 2015 World Cup consisted of 24 national teams, with two players competing for each side, and the initial round divided the entrants into four pools of six sides apiece. During the Group Stage, every national team played a best-of-five match against each of the other sides in their pool. Three victories were required to secure a head-to-head team win, but all five individual contests needed to be played, similar to the Davis Cup and Fed Cup formats in professional tennis. All matches were scheduled to include two singles contests, a doubles encounter, and two reverse singles showdowns. The top two teams from each bracket advanced to the Knockout Stages.

During the Quarter-Finals, Semi-Finals, and Championship Final, the remaining national sides were paired off a head-to-head knockout bracket. The format for these head-to-head matches was a sudden death best-of-seven competition, similar to professional sporting events like baseball's World Series and basketball's NBA Finals, with the contest coming to an end as soon as one team accumulated four individual victories. These encounters were scheduled as two singles showdowns, a doubles match, two reverse singles contests, another doubles encounter, and a winner-take-all singles showdown if necessary. The side that won the Final were named champions.

Group round

Group A

Group B

Group C

Group D

Final round

Final

Century breaks
There were 10 century breaks in the tournament.
  – 137 Pankaj Advani
  B – 134, 100 Yan Bingtao
  – 130, 108 Mark Williams
  – 122 John Higgins
  – 111 Neil Robertson
  – 108 Dechawat Poomjaeng
  – 105 Itaro Santos
  – 105 Tony Drago

References

External links
 

World Cup (snooker)
World Cup
World Cup
Snooker competitions in China
Sport in Wuxi
June 2015 sports events in China